Land of Wealth (Traditional Chinese: 匯通天下) is a TVB costume drama series broadcast in September 2006.

Synopsis
During the Qing dynasty in Beijing, a powerful empress took over the throne. The story focus on four different families. The Chai family, Chai Hok-Yan (Chung King Fai), who was betrayed by other officials and the whole family was sentenced to death. Chai Pak-Chuen (Moses Chan) was the only survivor in the Chai family because a loyal assistant of his switched identities with him. Pak-Cheun changed his name to Fan Chi-Chai and traveled to a different city to start a new life. That's when he met the Kiu family. Kiu Bun-Yip (David Chiang), is a successful business banker, however, he also has enemies, including the Cho family. Bun-Yip invited Pak-Chuen to his bank Ding Fung Shing to learn about banking. At the same time, he met Cheung Shung-Man (Steven Ma), the two of them became best friends.

Pak-Chuen met Ba Ba Ha Yee Ko-Wa (Sonija Kwok), the two of fell in love, but because of a little misunderstanding due to Pak-Chuen refusing to marry Ko-Wa and suggested that their marriage will only burden his career. Ko-Wa married to Bun-Yip instead to make Pak-Chuen jealous. Shung-Man and Bun-Yip's daughter, Kiu Choi (Tavia Yeung) were also in loved, however Shung-Man's family disapprove the marriage. Choi married Pak-Chuen instead because Bun Yip passed the position of Head Master of Ding Fung Shing to Pak-Chuen. His eldest son-in-law, Fong Yun-Tin (Kenny Wong), who is in the position as Second Master of Ding Fung Sing object the idea by saying that the position as Head Master cannot be pass to outsider.

Later on, Pak-Chuen became more and more successful in the business of banking, Bun-Yip asked Pak-Chuen to lead the banking business. At the same time, Pak-Chuen is also seeking revenge for his family, and trying to find who was behind the whole scheme. As the story goes on, the family goes through many hardships and obstacles in life. It's about betrayal, and corruption in business and in the government around a world of good, innocent people. The story also revolves around China's first banks and problems that they had to face.

Cast

Viewership ratings

References

External links
TVB.com Land of Wealth - Official Website 

TVB dramas
2006 Hong Kong television series debuts
2006 Hong Kong television series endings